The Gustav-Steinmann-Medaille is a scientific award by the  -  (German Geological Society-Geological Association) to an individual who has made outstanding contributions in the fields of geology and earth sciences. The award is named after the German geologist and paleontologist Gustav Steinmann.

Laureates 
The medal has been awarded each year to the following scientists:

See also

 List of geology awards

References

Geology awards
Awards established in 1938